George Howe (July 4, 1824 - February 21, 1888) was a Vermont attorney and politician.  Howe was most notable for his service as United States Attorney for the District of Vermont from 1861 to 1864 and a member of the Vermont Senate from 1874 to 1875.

Biography
George Howe was born in Vernon, Vermont on July 4, 1824, the son of Ebenezer Howe Jr. and Lydia (Fowler) Howe.  He was educated in Vernon, and studied law with Judge Asa Keyes of Brattleboro.   In 1845, he began attendance at Harvard Law School, and he received his ll.b. degree in 1847.  Howe completed his legal studies in the office of William Czar Bradley in Westminster.  He was admitted to the bar in 1847, and practiced in Brattleboro.

Howe spent several years in California in the late 1840s and early 1850s before returning to Brattleboro to reestablish his law practice.  A Republican, he served as Windham County's State's Attorney from 1858 to 1860.  In 1861, he was appointed United States Attorney for the District of Vermont, and he served until 1864.  Howe represented Windham County in the Vermont Senate from 1874 to 1875, and he was a delegate to the 1876 Republican National Convention.

In 1880, Howe accepted a federal government position as a pension examiner, which required him to travel throughout New England to verify the details of applications and adjudicate claims.  In the last years of his life, Howe's health began to fail and he retired to Vernon.

Death and burial
Howe died in Vernon on February 21, 1888.  He was buried at North Vernon Cemetery in Vernon.

Family
In 1850, Howe married Mary Ann Willard (1824-1905) of Westminster.  They were the parents of a son, George E. Howe (1862-1920), who graduated from Harvard College and Harvard Law School and became a successful attorney in Boston.

References

Sources

Books

Internet

1824 births
1888 deaths
People from Brattleboro, Vermont
Harvard Law School alumni
Vermont lawyers
State's attorneys in Vermont
United States Attorneys for the District of Vermont
Republican Party Vermont state senators
Burials in Vermont
19th-century American politicians
19th-century American lawyers